"¡Ay, caramba!", from the Spanish interjections  (denoting surprise or pain) and  (a minced oath for ), is an exclamation used in Portuguese (Ai, caramba!) and Spanish to denote surprise (usually positive).

In popular culture
The exclamation became associated with the Madrid flamenco dancer and singer La Caramba in the 1780s. Her headdress of brightly colored ribbons became known as a caramba.

The knife-throwing villain in Tintin's adventure The Broken Ear (1935) exclaims "Caramba! Missed again!" so often it became a catchphrase in French ("Caramba, encore raté!")

The fictional character Bart Simpson (voiced by Nancy Cartwright) popularized the phrase "¡Ay, caramba!" in the animated sitcom The Simpsons. He said it first in the 1988 short The Art Museum, one of several one-minute Simpsons cartoons that ran as interstitials on The Tracey Ullman Show from April 14, 1987 to May 14, 1989 on Fox. In the episode "Selma's Choice", Bart, Lisa, and their Aunt Selma approach a very popular ride at Duff Gardens. Upon seeing the exceptionally long line for the ride, Bart exclaims, "¡Ay, caramba!". "¡Ay, caramba!" were also Bart's first words when he saw his parents having sex.

See also
 D'oh!
 Facepalm
 Sacrebleu

References

Comedy catchphrases
Spanish profanity
Spanish words and phrases
The Simpsons
Quotations from television
Quotations from animation
1988 neologisms